Fiskales Ad-Hok is the second album of the band Chilean Fiskales Ad-Hok, and their first release on a major label. After opening for The Ramones in Santiago in 1992, there were many offers from record companies to record an album. Fiskales Ad-Hok signed with "La Batuta Records", releasing this effort as a one-off.

Track listing
 "Piedad"
 "Cristianos"
 "La Ranchera"
 "Hambre del Corazón"
 "Madre Patria"
 "Libertad Vigilada"
 "Santiago"
 "Tonto"
 "Ron Silver"
 "Para Mamá"
 "Almorzando Entre Muertos"
 "Papapa"
 "El Cóndor"
 "Borracho"

Personnel
Álvaro España – vocals
Viper – guitar
Micky – drums
Roly Urzua – bass

1993 albums
Fiskales Ad-Hok albums